SS Martin Behrman was an American Liberty ship built in 1944 for service in World War II. Her namesake was Martin Behrman, long-time mayor of New Orleans, Louisiana. For the was she was operated by the Isbrandtsen Line under charter with the Maritime Commission and War Shipping Administration.

Among the Liberty ships, the Martin Behrman was an EC2-S-C1 Type with Maritime Commission hull number 2827. Most Liberty ships were named after prominent deceased Americans.

This particular ship was built by Delta Shipbuilding Company in New Orleans. Her keel was laid on 25 October 1944 and she was launched on 4 December 1944. The Delta shipyard was started specifically for the war effort, at a site on the Industrial Canal near the Almonaster Avenue Bridge, immediately south of the present-day I-10 high-rise bridge. The yard was shut down after the end of the war.

The Martin Behrman survived World War II and saw service in the Korean War. In 1947 she was engaged in the Indonesian trade in defiance of a Dutch blockade, and on one voyage her cargo was confiscated by the Dutch Navy.

She was scrapped at Portland, Oregon in 1965. Her bow, along with the bows of many other Liberty ships, is buried at the Liberty Ship Memorial Park in Portland.

References

 

Liberty ships
Ships built in New Orleans
SS Martin Behrman